Danville is a city in Yell County, Arkansas, United States. The population was 2,409 at the 2010 census.  Along with Dardanelle, it is one of two county seats for Yell County.

Danville is part of the Russellville Micropolitan Statistical Area.

Geography
Danville is located at  (35.053572, -93.391623).

History
After Yell County was created in 1840, local commissioners met to select a site for the county seat, settling on what is now Danville as the best location. The city was laid out in December 1841 by James Briggs, James Williams, and Nerick Morse. The home of William Peevy in Monrovia, a few miles north of Danville, was used as a temporary county seat in the interim. The city was named after the steamboat Danville, which plied the Petit Jean River in the 1840s. A log courthouse was constructed at Danville in 1844, though this was replaced by a frame building by 1850. A Masonic lodge was organized in Danville in the late 1840s. The number of creeks in the area led to the construction of numerous water power mills around Danville.

Industry

The primary industry/employer is poultry farming and processing, along with other forms of agriculture.

Danville is home to a municipal airport, Danville Municipal Airport, with a 0.84 mile runway (4,466 ft). The airport his home to 10 aircraft and averages 67 flight a week. The airport includes amentias such as 24/7 self-fuel service, private hangers, and a pilot's lounge.

The small town is also the hometown of Chambers Bank that has locations all across western Arkansas.

Demographics

2020 census

As of the 2020 United States census, there were 2,028 people, 657 households, and 501 families residing in the city.

2010 census
As of the 2010 census Danville had a population of 2,409.  The ethnic and racial composition of the population was 52.6% Hispanic or Latino, 42.1% non-Hispanic white, 2.1% African-American, 0.6% Native American, 1.5% Asian (all not from the generally delineated sub-groups) and 3.1% reporting two or more races.

2000 census
As of the census of 2000, there were 2,392 people, 716 households, and 499 families residing in the city. The racial makeup of the city was 65.22% White, 1.84% Black or African American, 0.59% Native American, 1.30% Asian, 29.35% from other races, and 1.71% from two or more races.  43.48% of the population were Hispanic or Latino of any race.

There were 716 households, out of which 35.9% had children under the age of 18 living with them, 50.1% were married couples living together, 12.4% had a female householder with no husband present, and 30.3% were non-families. 23.6% of all households were made up of individuals, and 13.7% had someone living alone who was 65 years of age or older.  The average household size was 3.01 and the average family size was 3.44.

In the city, the population was spread out, with 26.3% under the age of 18, 13.8% from 18 to 24, 29.4% from 25 to 44, 15.9% from 45 to 64, and 14.6% who were 65 years of age or older.  The median age was 30 years. For every 100 females, there were 109.1 males.  For every 100 females age 18 and over, there were 106.2 males.

The median income for a household in the city was $26,506, and the median income for a family was $29,185. Males had a median income of $17,122 versus $16,604 for females. The per capita income for the city was $12,533.  About 17.5% of families and 21.2% of the population were below the poverty line, including 26.9% of those under age 18 and 9.5% of those age 65 or over.

Education 
Public education for elementary and secondary school students is available from the Danville School District, which leads to graduation from Danville High School. The district and high school's mascot and athletic emblem is the Little Johns.

Notable people

Alfred Surratt, born in Danville, was an American baseball outfielder for the Kansas City Monarchs, a Negro league baseball franchise based in Kansas City, Missouri, from 1947 until 1952.
Lloyd R. George, former Danville Mayor, served in the Arkansas House of Representatives from 1963-1967 and 1973–1997.

See also 
 KYEL

References

Cities in Arkansas
Cities in Yell County, Arkansas
County seats in Arkansas
Russellville, Arkansas micropolitan area